The Swansea East by-election 2001 is a by-election that was held for the Welsh Assembly constituency of Swansea East on Thursday 27 September 2001, following the death of its sitting Assembly Member, Val Feld.

The election was the first by-election to be held for a seat in the Welsh Assembly, taking place two years after the inaugural elections in 1999.

Result

Eight candidates were nominated for the election.

Previous Result

References

By-elections to the Senedd
2001 elections in the United Kingdom
2001 in Wales
2000s elections in Wales
History of Swansea
Politics of Swansea
September 2001 events in the United Kingdom